Romeo Sisti (9 February 1902 – 13 October 1971) was an Italian rower. He competed at the 1928 Summer Olympics in Amsterdam with the men's coxless pair where they came fourth.

References

External links
 

1902 births
1971 deaths
Italian male rowers
Olympic rowers of Italy
Rowers at the 1928 Summer Olympics
European Rowing Championships medalists